Christina Lauren (the combined penname of Christina Hobbs and Lauren Billings Luhrs) is an American author duo of contemporary fiction, teen fiction and romance novels.

Career 
The pair met in 2009 while writing fanfiction online, and in 2010 became coauthors, signing agent Holly Root from the Waxman-Leavell Literary Agency in 2011. In 2017 Holly Root founded Root Literary.

Author of eighteen New York Times Bestselling novels, their work is currently translated in over 30 languages.

Together they present workshops and have been speakers at events such as RT Booklovers Convention, Book Expo of America (BEA), Romance Writers of America (RWA), and are frequent guests at San Diego Comic Con International.

Beautiful series 
In 2013 Beautiful Bastard was optioned by Constantin Film for a film adaptation. The rights later reverted to the authors.

Wild Seasons series 
The second series by the author debuted in 2014. The first novel of the series, Sweet Filthy Boy, earned the Romantic Times Book of the Year award for 2014. The series centers on a group of friends following graduation from college. Lauren has been praised for writing delectable heroes and strong-willed heroines to match. Like books in the Beautiful series, all of the Wild Seasons books to date have hit the New York Times list.

Roomies 
Andy Fickman will direct and produce the music-driven romantic comedy "Roomies" with Jenna Dewan via her company, Everheart Productions. Christina Lauren will write the screenplay.

The Unhoneymooners 
The Unhoneymooners spent 14 weeks on the NYT Bestseller List. In 2021 Deadline announced that BCDF had optioned it for film. Joseph Muszynski adapted the novel and BCDF Pictures’ Claude Dal Farra and Brian Keady are producing with Kelsey Law.

Honors 
 2013 Best Romance Nominee Goodreads Choice Awards (Beautiful Bastard) 
 2013 Best Romance Audible.com (Beautiful Stranger) 
 2014 RT Seal of Excellence Award (Sweet Filthy Boy) 
 2014 RT Book of the Year (Sweet Filthy Boy) 
 2014 Goodreads Choice Nominee Best Romance (Sweet Filthy Boy)
 2015 Kirkus Starred Review (The House)
 2016 An Amazon Editor's Choice Best Books of 2016 (Wicked Sexy Liar)
 2017 Kirkus Starred Review (Dating You/Hating You)
 2017 Amazon Best Romance of the Year (Dating You/Hating You)
 2017 Publishers Weekly Starred Review (Roomies)
 2017 Goodreads Choice Nominee Best Young Adult Fiction (Autoboyography)
 2017 Best of the Year Finalist Audible.com (Autoboyography)
 2017 American Library Association Rainbow List (Autoboyography)
 2017 Lambda Literary Award Finalist (Autoboyography) 
 2017 Vulture Top Ten Romance (Dating You/Hating You) 
 2017 Washington Post Top Five Romance (Dating You/Hating You) 
 2017 Entertainment Weekly Top Ten Romance (Roomies) 
 2018 Kirkus Starred Review (Love and Other Words)
2018 Kirkus Starred Review (Josh and Hazel's Guide to Not Dating)
2018 Publishers Weekly Starred Review (My Favorite Half-Night Stand)
2018 Goodreads Choice Nominee Best Romance (Roomies)
2018 Goodreads Choice Nominee Best Romance (Josh and Hazel's Guide to Not Dating)
2018 Amazon Best Romances of the Year (Josh and Hazel's Guide to Not Dating)
2018 New York Public Library Best Books of the Year (Josh and Hazel's Guide to Not Dating)
2019 Kirkus Starred Review (The Unhoneymooners)
2019 Publishers Weekly Starred Review (The Unhoneymooners)
2019 Library Journal Starred Review (The Unhoneymooners)
2019 Indie Next List (The Unhoneymooners)
2019 Goodreads Choice Nominee Best Romance (The Unhoneymooners)
2019 Amazon Best Romances of the Year (The Unhoneymooners)
2019 Audible Best Rom Coms of the Year (The Unhoneymooners)
2019 Library Reads Hall of Fame
2019 Bookbub Best Romances of the Year (The Unhoneymooners)
2019 Indie Next List (Twice in a Blue Moon)
2020 Bookpage Best Romance Novels of 2020 So Far (The Honey-Don't List)
2020 Kirkus Starred Review (The Honey Don't List)
2020 Publishers Weekly Starred Review (In a Holidaze)
2020 Library Journal Starred Review (In a Holidaze)
2020 Book Page Starred Review (In a Holidaze)
2020 Goodreads Choice Nominee Best Romance (In a Holidaze)
2020 Oprah's Romance Novels We Couldn't Put Down (The Honey Don't List)
2021 Audie Award Finalist Best Romance (The Honey Don't List)
2021 Kirkus Starred Review (The Soulmate Equation)
2021 ALA Booklist Starred Review (The Soulmate Equation)
2021 Indie Next List (The Soulmate Equation)
2021 Library Journal Starred Review (The Soulmate Equation)
2021 Barnes & Noble Best Books of 2021 (The Soulmate Equation)
2021 Indigo Top Ten Romance of 2021 (The Soulmate Equation)
2021 Kirkus Best Romances of the Year (The Soulmate Equation)
2021 Kobo Best Romances of the Year (The Soulmate Equation)
2021 SheReads.com Best Romances of the Year (The Soulmate Equation)
2021 Goodreads Choice Nominee Best Romance (The Soulmate Equation)
2021 Audible Best of 2021 (The Soulmate Equation)
2021 Buzzfeed Best Romance Novels of 2021 (Soulmate Equation)
2021 Scribd Best Romance Novels of 2021
2022 Kirkus Starred Review (Something Wilder)
2022 Booklist Starred Review (Something Wilder)
2022 Indie Next List (Something Wilder)
2022 Indigo’s Top 10 Romance Books of 2022 (Something Wilder)
2022 Washington Post 10 Best Romance Novels of 2022 (Something Wilder)
2022 Entertainment Weekly's Top 10 Romances of 2022 (Something Wilder)
2022 Apple Books Top Selling Romances of the Year (Something Wilder)
2023 Library Journal Starred Review (The True Love Experiment)
2023 Kirkus Starred Review (The True Love Experiment)

Bibliography

Beautiful series

 Beautiful Bastard (2013)
 Beautiful Stranger (2013)
 Beautiful Bitch (2013)
 Beautiful Bombshell (2013)
 Beautiful Player (2013)
 Beautiful Beginning (2013)
 Beautiful Beloved (2015)
 Beautiful Secret (2015)
 Beautiful Boss (2016)
 Beautiful (2016)

Wild Seasons series
 Sweet Filthy Boy (2014)
 Dirty Rowdy Thing (2014)
 Dark Wild Night (2015)
 Wicked Sexy Liar (2016)
 Not Joe's Not So Short Short (novella, 2016)

Standalones
 A Little Crazy (2014)
 Sublime (2014)
 The House (2015)
 Dating You/Hating You (2017)
 Autoboyography (2017)
 Roomies (2017)
 Love and Other Words (2018)
 Josh and Hazel's Guide to Not Dating (2018)
 My Favorite Half-Night Stand (2018)
 The Unhoneymooners (2019)
 Twice in a Blue Moon (2019)
 The Honey-Don't List (2020)
 In A Holidaze (2020)
 The Soulmate Equation (2021)
 Something Wilder (2022)
 The True Love Experiment (Expected publication May 2023)

Charity work 

Along with fellow writer Nina Bocci, the pair created and ran a non-profit organization known as Fandom Gives Back. From 2009-2012 Fandom Gives Back raised over $235,000 for Alex's Lemonade Stand.

References

External links

Living people
Writers from California
Novelists from Utah
American romantic fiction writers
21st-century American novelists
American bloggers
American women novelists
Year of birth missing (living people)
21st-century American women writers
Women romantic fiction writers
American women bloggers
Pseudonymous women writers
21st-century pseudonymous writers
Writing duos